The cervical spinal nerve 6 (C6) is a spinal nerve of the cervical segment.

It originates from the spinal column from above the cervical vertebra 6 (C6).

The C6 nerve root shares a common branch from C5, and has a role in innervating many muscles of the rotator cuff and distal arm, including:
 
Subclavius
Supraspinatus
Infraspinatus
Biceps Brachii
Brachialis
Deltoid
Teres Minor
Brachioradialis
Serratus Anterior
Subscapularis
Pectoralis Major
Coracobrachialis
Teres Major
Supinator
Extensor Carpi Radialis Brevis
Extensor Carpi Radialis Longus
Latissimus Dorsi

Damage to the C6 motor neuron, by way of impingement, ischemia, trauma, or degeneration of nerve tissue, can cause denervation of one or more of the associated muscles. Muscle atrophy and other secondary complications can occur.

Additional Images

References

Spinal nerves